Pseudoxandra lucida is a species of plant in the family Annonaceae.  It is native to Bolivia, Brazil, Colombia, Peru, and Venezuela.  Robert Elias Fries, the Swedish botanist who first formally described the species, named it after its shiny ( in Latin) leaves.

Description
It is a tree reaching 3 to 20 meters in height. Its shiny leathery leaves are 7-20 by 2-6.5 centimeters and come to a point at their tips.  The leaves are hairless on their upper and lower surfaces, but can have small warty bumps.  The leaves are green, greenish brown or dark brown above and brown on their underside.  Its petioles are 5-8 millimeters long. Its flowers are solitary or in pairs and axillary. Each flower is on a pedicel 2-5 millimeters long. Its flowers have 3 oval-shaped sepals that are 1.5-3 by 3-5 millimeters.  The outer surface of the sepals is densely hairy. Its 6 petals are arranged in two rows of 3. The outer petals are pale green to yellow and 8-11 by 6-10 millimeters.  The outer petals are densely hairy on their outer surface. The inner petals are similarly colored, 7-14 by 5-7 millimeters, and concave. The inner petals are smooth on their outer surface except for a hairy patch running from the tip to the base. It has numerous stamens that are 2-3.5 millimeters long.  Each flower has 2-20 monocarps that are red, orange, purple or black at maturity and 9-14 millimeters wide. Its brown seeds are 8-12 by 9-11 millimeters.

Reproductive biology
The pollen of P. lucida is shed as permanent tetrads.

References

External links
 

Flora of Bolivia
Flora of Brazil
Flora of Colombia
Flora of Peru
Flora of Venezuela
Plants described in 1937
lucida
Taxa named by Robert Elias Fries